"Dead Man's Party" is a song by American band Oingo Boingo, released as the third single from their album of the same name.

The song was released on a 12" single in conjunction with another song from the album, "Stay," with the cover art touting it as the single's a-side, while the catalog number and some discographies consider it the single's b-side. An edited version of "Dead Man's Party" was featured in a promotional music video and was issued in 1986 as the b-side of the 7" single "Just Another Day," also culled from the Dead Man's Party album.

The lyric, "I hear the chauffeur coming to my door/Says there's room for maybe just one more," is a reference to "The Bus-Conductor," a short story by E. F. Benson about a hearse driver, first published in The Pall Mall Magazine in 1906. The story has been adapted several times and spawned an urban legend, with each version using the catchphrase, "Room for one more."

The song has made many appearances in popular culture. It is perhaps best known for its appearance in the 1986 film Back to School, where the band performs it at a party. It was also featured in the series Chuck in the episode "Chuck Versus the Couch Lock," during John Casey's fake funeral, as well as the Malcolm in the Middle episode "Halloween", in season 2 of Supergirl, in a promo for season 5 of the series Bones and in season 4 of The Blacklist. It is also referenced in the novel Ready Player One. The song's name was also used as the title of the second episode of season three of Buffy the Vampire Slayer as well as a quest in The Witcher 3: Wild Hunt – Hearts of Stone.

Danny Elfman performed the song as the final encore of his Nightmare Before Christmas concerts at the Hollywood Bowl in 2015, 2016, and 2018, and at Banc of California Stadium in 2021, alongside his former Oingo Boingo guitarist and arranger Steve Bartek.

Track listing
12" single
 Dead Man's Party (Party 'Til You're Dead Mix) - 8:37
 Stay (Stay Late Mix) - 5:59

Personnel 

 Danny Elfman – lead vocals, rhythm guitar
 Steve Bartek – lead guitar
 John Avila – bass, keytar, vocals
 Mike Bacich – keyboards
 Johnny "Vatos" Hernandez – drums, percussion
 Sam Phipps – tenor saxophone
 Leon Schneiderman – baritone & alto saxophones
 Dale Turner – trumpet, trombone
 Michael Frondelli - mixing

References

Songs about parties
1985 songs
1986 singles
Oingo Boingo songs
Halloween songs
Songs written by Danny Elfman
MCA Records singles